LMS Princess Coronation Class 46233 Duchess of Sutherland is a steam locomotive built in 1938 for the London, Midland and Scottish Railway (LMS) at Crewe Works to a design by William Stanier. It is a 4-6-2 Pacific locomotive built as part of the LMS Coronation Class for its express passenger services, including the Royal Scot service from London to Glasgow.

Withdrawn by British Railways in 1964, the locomotive was originally sold to Butlins holiday camp in Scotland. In 1996, the locomotive was acquired by The Princess Royal Class Locomotive Trust with the intention of restoration to mainline condition. In 2001, 46233 was restored to operating condition and since then has been a regular performer on the national network.

Service 
6233 was outshopped in July 1938 from Crewe Works and was part of the third batch of her class. These were unstreamlined, painted in LMS standard crimson lake livery and had a single chimney and no smoke deflectors and an estimated cost of £13,800 each.

6233 was initially allocated to Camden, London. It acquired a double chimney in March 1941 and because of drifting smoke acquired smoke deflectors in September 1945 before being painted in postwar LMS black livery in September 1946. With the creation of British Railways (BR) on 1 January 1948 it was allocated to Crewe North depot. BR renumbered the locomotive to 46233 in October 1948 and repainted it in BR Brunswick green livery in 1952 or early 1953. In June 1958 it was allocated to Carlisle Upperby before eventually being withdrawn from Edge Hill depot in February 1964.  During its 25 years service Duchess of Sutherland ran  - the second highest mileage by any member of the class.

Preservation 

Following withdrawal from service, 46233 was acquired by Butlins Heads-of-Ayr holiday camp, Scotland, in October 1964. It was later purchased by Bressingham Steam Museum. In 1996, 6233 was acquired by the Princess Royal Class Locomotive Trust (PRCLT) arriving at the PRCLT's West Shed, at Swanwick Junction on the Midland Railway - Butterley,  on 3 February 1996. In 2001, No. 6233 returned to the national network after an overhaul assisted by the heritage lottery fund and match funded by the PRCLT. 

To allow it to run on the main line in preservation, 6233 was fitted with Train Protection & Warning System (TPWS) and on-train monitoring recorder (OTMR) equipment, alongside the BR fitted Automatic Warning System (AWS).

On 6 March 2010, 6233 was rolled out in LMS lined black livery, which was retained during 2010, before a major overhaul, taking 6233 out of service for the 2011 season.

On 3 March 2012, now renumbered 46233 was rolled out in "authentic (Brunswick) green" livery, as used by British Railways during the early 1950s,  at the Midland Railway - Butterley following a major overhaul.

On 9 September 2018, the engine regained its original number "6233" and LMS "Crimson Lake" livery to mark its 80th birthday.

Picture Gallery

Royal Train 
On 11 June 2002, the restored Duchess was the first steam locomotive to haul the Royal Train for 35 years, transporting Queen Elizabeth II on a tour to North Wales, from Holyhead to Llandudno Junction, as part of her Golden Jubilee. The trip also marked the 160th anniversary of the first Royal train in 1842.

On 22 March 2005 the Duchess again hauled the Royal Train, the second time for a steam locomotive in 40 years, transporting The Prince of Wales from Settle to Carlisle over the Settle-Carlisle Railway. The trip marked the 25th anniversary of the formation of the 'Friends of the Settle and Carlisle' pressure group. On the trip, the Prince spent a 15-minute spell at the controls of 6233.

References

External links 

 Princess Royal Locomotive Trust

6233 Duchess of Sutherland
Preserved London, Midland and Scottish Railway steam locomotives
Individual locomotives of Great Britain
Standard gauge steam locomotives of Great Britain